Middle Brother National Park is a protected area of 1830 hectares, situated in the Mid North Coast region of New South Wales. The nearest large town is Laurieton. The high rainfall and volcanic soils produce outstanding eucalyptus forest and rainforest. Large Flooded Gum and Blackbutt grow in sheltered areas.

The national park was formed to protect the two largest (by volume) coastal black beech trees - Bird Tree and Benaroon. Scientists believe that the bird tree is over 300 years old. It reaches an impressive size of 69 meters in height and 11 meters in circumference of the tree. For members of the Aboriginal people of Birpai, who are the traditional owners of the land, Middle Brother National Park has significant cultural importance.

See also
 Protected areas of New South Wales

References 

National parks of New South Wales
Forests of New South Wales
1999 establishments in Australia
Mid North Coast